Ingoldsby is a rural locality in the Lockyer Valley Region, Queensland, Australia.

History 
Hessenburg Provisional School opened on 11 June 1894.  On 1 January 1909, it became Hessenburg State School. Due to  anti-German sentiment during World War I, the district was renamed Ingoldsby and in 1916 the school was renamed Ingoldsby State School. It closed on 9 August 1974. It was at 1128-1130 Ingoldsby Road.

References

Further reading 
 

Lockyer Valley Region
Localities in Queensland